An urban heritage park is an unofficial designation for an inner-city area considered worthy of preservation because of its architectural or historic interest.

The term was first used to describe Castlefield in Manchester in 1982, inspired by examples of similar areas in Lowell, Massachusetts observed in 1975. After conservation area status was obtained for the area in Castlefield, a conservation committee representing the area's stakeholders was formed three years later, with three objectives:
To preserve and interpret the area's history
To influence future planning applications
To attract allocations of funds for improvements specially related to recreation and tourism
The group declared the area an "urban heritage park" later that year, and the term was heavily marketed. 25 years later, the term has become accepted, and appears in titles of academic courses.

References
Notes

Bibliography

External links
Planning Policy Guidance Note 15: Planning and the Historic Environment,

Archaeology of the United Kingdom
Architecture in the United Kingdom
Town and country planning in the United Kingdom